Nayef Al-Daihani (born 21 June 1956) is a Kuwaiti sport shooter. He competed in the 1992 Summer Olympics.

References

1956 births
Living people
Shooters at the 1992 Summer Olympics
Kuwaiti male sport shooters
Olympic shooters of Kuwait